Marshallena philippinarum is a species of sea snail, a marine gastropod mollusk in the family Marshallenidae.

Description
The length of the shell attains 25 mm.

The thin, white shell has a fusiform shape. It shows a moderately long spire and siphonal canal. It contains about 7 whorls. The protoconch and subsequent whorls are eroded, remaining 4 whorls convex, angular, separated by a deep suture. The sculpture consists of axial ribs, rather remote on the upper whorls, 19 in number on penultimate whorl, nearly disappearing on the body whorl and numerous, raised striae or growth lines. These are crossed by spirals, of which a subsutural one is beaded, as well as those on the angle of keel ; above this latter are a few faint spirals and more numerous ones on lower part of whorls, 4 on penultimate, about 20 on the body whorl and siphonal canal, faintly beaded or crenuliferous at the points of intercrossing. The aperture is elongately oval, with a rather blunt angle above, ending below in a rather narrow siphonal canal. The peristome is broken. The columellar margin is slightly concave above, straight below and along the siphonal canal, with a thin layer of enamel.

Distribution
This marine species occurs in the Flores Sea (at a depth of 794 m) and off Northeast Sumatra at depths between 750–794 m.

References

 Watson, R.B. 1882. Mollusca of "H.M.S. Challenger" expedition. Journal of the Linnean Society of London, Zoology 16: 324–343, 374–375 
 Smith, E.A. 1906. Natural History Notes from R.I.M.S. 'Investigator'- Series III., No. 10. On Mollusca from the Bay of Bengal and the Arabian Sea. Annals and Magazine of Natural History 7 18(106): 245–264 
 Schepman, M.M. 1913. Pulmonata. Opisthobranchia: Tectibranchiata, Tribe Bullomorpha. pp. 453–494 in Weber, M. & de Beaufort, L.F. (eds). The Prosobranchia, Pulmonata and Opisthobranchia Tectibranchiata, Tribe Bullomorpha, of the Siboga Expedition. Monograph 49. Siboga Expeditie 32(4)
 Kuroda, T. 1958. Descriptions of five new species of Japanese marine gastropods. Venus 2 20(2–3): pl. 21 
 Habe, T. 1964. Shells of the Western Pacific in color. Osaka : Hoikusha Vol. 2 233 pp., 66 pls. 
 Powell, A.W.B. 1966. The molluscan families Speightiidae and Turridae, an evaluation of the valid taxa, both Recent and fossil, with list of characteristic species. Bulletin of the Auckland Institute and Museum. Auckland, New Zealand 5: 1–184, pls 1–23 
 Powell, A.W.B. 1969. The family Turridae in the Indo-Pacific. Part. 2. The subfamily Turriculinae. Indo-Pacific Mollusca 2(10): 207–415, pls 188–324
 Kilburn, R.N. 1973. Notes on some benthic Mollusca from Natal and Mozambique, with descriptions of new species and subspecies of Calliostoma, Solariella, Latiaxis, Babylonia, Fusinus, Bathytoma and Conus. Annals of the Natal Museum 21(3): 557–578
 Wilson, B. 1994. Australian Marine Shells. Prosobranch Gastropods. Kallaroo, WA : Odyssey Publishing Vol. 2 370 pp.
 Sysoev, Alexander. Mollusca Gastropoda: new deep-water turrid gastropods (Conoidea) from eastern Indonesia. Muséum national d'Histoire naturelle, 1997.
 Tucker, J.K. 2004. Catalog of recent and fossil turrids (Mollusca: Gastropoda). Zootaxa 682: 1–1295

External links
 Schepman, 1913. The prosobranchia of the Siboga expedition. Part IV -V – VI: Toxoglossa
  Tucker, J.K. 2004 Catalog of recent and fossil turrids (Mollusca: Gastropoda). Zootaxa 682:1–1295.
 
 Specimen at MNHN, Paris

philippinarum
Gastropods described in 1882